Amorphoscelis nubeculosa is a species of praying mantis found in Cameroon.

References

Amorphoscelis
Insects described in 1908
Invertebrates of Cameroon